Stephan Hanke (born 19 October 1972) is a German former professional footballer who played as a midfielder.

Career
Hanke started his senior career with Bayer 04 Leverkusen in 1991, before moving to FC St. Pauli in 1994. In 2000, he signed for Siirtspor in the Turkish Süper Lig, where he made 32 appearances and scored five goals. After that, he played for German clubs SSV Jahn Regensburg, Hamburger SV II,  FC Rot-Weiß Erfurt, and Altonaer FC von 1893, before retiring in 2008.

References

External links 
 Premierentor genau vor Augen
 Premierentor genau vor Augen (all shown)
 Jetzt will Stephan Hanke (25) mit St. Pauli zurück in die Bundesliga Fiese Pfiffe, aber Stepi biß sich durch
 FC Hartz IV
 Patricia in Notfall-Klinik - Prügelei Marin/Hanke Kleppo: Angst um Ehefrau
 200.000 Mark verschenkt - und Hanke verletzte sich noch Kopfschütteln nach der Hallen-Pleite
 

1972 births
Living people
Siirtspor footballers
FC Rot-Weiß Erfurt players
Hamburger SV players
German footballers
German expatriate footballers
SSV Jahn Regensburg players
Expatriate footballers in Turkey
SV Darmstadt 98 players
Association football midfielders
FC St. Pauli players
Hamburger SV II players
Bayer 04 Leverkusen players
Altonaer FC von 1893 players
Footballers from Mannheim